Pliciloricus dubius is a marine Loriciferan species of genus Pliciloricus described by Higgins & Kristensen 1986.

Distribution 
Pliciloricus dubius is a species that has been designated for the waters of the Atlantic Ocean north and northwest.

References

External links 

 Integrated Taxonomic Information System (ITIS): Pliciloricus dubius Higgins and Kristensen, 1986 Taxonomic Serial No.: 722189
 Smithsonian National Museum of Natural History: Pliciloricus dubius
 Encyclopedia of Life (EOL): Pliciloricus dubius

Loricifera
Animals described in 1986